Harry A. Bishop (c. 1869 – May 12, 1920) was an Alaskan politician and the seventh mayor of Juneau, Alaska, from 1912 to 1913.

1860s births
1920 deaths
Mayors of Juneau, Alaska
Alaska Democrats